Leonie Marjorie Short (born 1 January 1956) was a member of the Australian House of Representatives for eight months in 2001, representing the western Brisbane seat of Ryan for the Australian Labor Party, a party she had been a member of since 1981. Short was elected on 17 March 2001 at a by-election following the resignation of John Moore in what was normally a safe Liberal seat.

The Liberals' preferred candidate, Michael Johnson, was unable to stand because he had not renounced his British citizenship.  Short defeated former state Liberal president Bob Tucker, with a swing of 9.59%. Issues such as the introduction of the GST, and increased petrol and beer prices, dominated the by-election. The seat reverted to the Liberals at the general election in November 2001, in which Short was defeated by Michael Johnson.

Short has a Bachelor of Arts and a Masters of Health Planning, and is a registered dental therapist. Following her time in parliament, she worked at Teachers Union Health and DRUG ARM. She then helped establish Australia's first new Dental School in 57 years at Griffith University on the Gold Coast.  She is currently Associate Professor of Oral Health at Central Queensland University in Rockhampton. She has published numerous articles in professional journals and has been awarded over $1m in competitive research grants. She is a life member of the Australian Dental and Oral Health Therapists' Association, an Associate Fellow of the Australian College of Health Service Executives, and a member of the Australian Institute of Company Directors.

References
Leonie Short, Parliamentary Library Biography

1956 births
Living people
Australian Labor Party members of the Parliament of Australia
Members of the Australian House of Representatives
Members of the Australian House of Representatives for Ryan
Women members of the Australian House of Representatives
Academic staff of Central Queensland University
21st-century Australian politicians
21st-century Australian women politicians